The Games is a 1970 British sports drama film directed by Michael Winner. It is based on the 1968 Hugh Atkinson novel and adapted to the screen by Erich Segal. The plot concerned four marathon competitors at a fictitious Olympic Games in Rome, played by Michael Crawford, Ryan O'Neal, Charles Aznavour and Athol Compton. Elton John recorded one song ("From Denver To L.A.") for the soundtrack.

Plot
American athlete Scott Reynolds, British athlete Harry Hayes, Czechoslovak athlete Pavel Vendek, and Indigenous Australian athlete Sunny Pintubi train for the Rome Olympics marathon.

Cast
 Michael Crawford as Harry Hayes, British competitor
 Ryan O'Neal as Scott Reynolds, American competitor
 Charles Aznavour as Pavel Vendek, Czechoslovak competitor 
 Jeremy Kemp as Jim Harcourt 
 Elaine Taylor as Christine 
 Stanley Baker as Bill Oliver 
 Athol Compton as Sunny Pintubi, Australian competitor 
 Rafer Johnson, Ron Pickering & Adrian Metcalfe as Commentators 
 Kent Smith as Kaverley 
 Sam Elliott as Richie Robinson 
 Mona Washbourne as Mrs. Hayes 
 Reg Lye as Gilmour 
 June Jago as Mae Harcourt 
 Don Newsome as Cal Wood

Production
Athol Compton was an Aboriginal Australian postman who had never acted before being cast in the film.

To simulate vast crowds of people, thousands of life-sized dummies were placed in the stadium's seats in Rome's Olympic stadium.

Reception
According to Fox records, the film required $7,500,000 in rentals to break even and by 11 December 1970 had made $2,825,000, meaning a loss to the studio.

Howard Thompson of The New York Times declared that "this beautifully scenic and perceptive drama, centering on four marathon contestants at the Rome Olympiad, is a nice antidote for the hot weather. The real star of the picture is Michael Winner, who has directed some previous British exercises with brisk adroitness and stamps this unstartling but engrossing eyeful with the same visual appeal." Arthur D. Murphy of Variety opined that "with the outdated polemics of director Michael Winner, the banalities of Erich Segal's adaptation of a Hugh Atkinson novel, and a rather lifeless and cardboard cast, the 20th-Fox release amounts to a dull Frank Merriwell yarn, hyped a bit to the level of high-school mentality." Gene Siskel of the Chicago Tribune gave the film one-and-a-half stars out of four and wrote, "If Erich Segal's screenplay had its tongue in its cheek, the four stories could be dismissed as comedy of stereotypes." Charles Champlin of the Los Angeles Times wrote that "what strikes you about 'The Games' is what is such beautiful scenery doing in a dumb script like this?" He elaborated that the screenplay contained "almost every cliche known to sports." The Monthly Film Bulletin commented, "A cliché-ridden script with much high-flown dialogue and the kind of flashy shooting one has come to expect from Michael Winner (all staccato cutting and ugly zooms) make it difficult to work up much interest in the fate of the four protagonists of The Games."

References

External links
 
 

1970 films
British drama films
Films directed by Michael Winner
Films about the Summer Olympics
Films about Olympic track and field
Films based on Australian novels
Films set in London
Films set in Rome
1970 drama films
20th Century Fox films
Running films
Films scored by Francis Lai
1970s English-language films
1970s British films